Royal Swedish Army Drum Corps was a marching band of the Swedish Armed Forces Music Corps, comprising 25 musicians who served from 1992 to 2009.

External links 
 Arméns Trumkårs Vänner (TRKV) – Drum Corps Veterans 

Swedish military bands
Wind bands
Musical groups established in 1992